Andreas Mrosek (born 18 January 1958) is a German politician. Born in Dessau, Saxony-Anhalt, he represents Alternative for Germany (AfD). Andreas Mrosek has served as a member of the Bundestag from the state of Saxony-Anhalt since 2017.

Life 
He became member of the bundestag after the 2017 German federal election. He is a member of the Sports Committee and the Committee for Transport and Digital Infrastructure.

References

External links 

  
 Bundestag biography 

1958 births
Living people
Members of the Bundestag for Saxony-Anhalt
Members of the Bundestag 2017–2021
People from Dessau-Roßlau
Members of the Bundestag for the Alternative for Germany